Akzhurek Dostykuly Tanatarov (born 3 September 1986) is a Kazakh freestyle wrestler. At the 2012 Summer Olympics he was defeated in the semifinal round of the 66 kg freestyle event by Sushil Kumar of India. He won a bronze medal in the repechage round, beating Ramazan Şahin in his bronze medal match.

References

External links
 

1986 births
Sportspeople from Almaty
Olympic wrestlers of Kazakhstan
Wrestlers at the 2012 Summer Olympics
Living people
Olympic bronze medalists for Kazakhstan
Olympic medalists in wrestling
Medalists at the 2012 Summer Olympics
Kazakhstani male sport wrestlers
World Wrestling Championships medalists
Asian Wrestling Championships medalists